Alfredo da Silva Castro (born 5 October 1962), known simply as Alfredo, is a Portuguese former footballer who played as a goalkeeper.

He appeared in 309 Primeira Liga matches over 17 seasons, representing Rio Ave and Boavista.

Club career
Alfredo was born in Vila do Conde. After emerging through the youth system of hometown's Rio Ave F.C. he went on to represent Boavista FC, being an undisputed starter for the latter for more than a Primeira Liga decade.

After his retirement in 1998, at nearly 36, Alfredo served as goalkeeping coach for his last club as it achieved its only national league conquest in 2001. During his playing spell with the Porto side he won four major titles in the 90s, two Portuguese Cups and as many domestic Supercups.

In the 2009–10 season, shortly after leaving Boavista, Alfredo returned to his first team Rio Ave, again being in charge of their goalkeepers. He also worked in that capacity with CS Pandurii Târgu Jiu in Romania.

International career
Alfredo earned three caps for Portugal in two years, and was in roster for the UEFA Euro 1996 tournament.

Honours
Boavista
Taça de Portugal: 1991–92, 1996–97
Supertaça Cândido de Oliveira: 1992, 1997

References

External links

1962 births
Living people
People from Vila do Conde
Portuguese footballers
Association football goalkeepers
Primeira Liga players
Rio Ave F.C. players
Boavista F.C. players
Portugal under-21 international footballers
Portugal international footballers
UEFA Euro 1996 players
Sportspeople from Porto District